Golden Void is a psychedelic rock band from the San Francisco Bay Area. The band consists of guitarist/vocalist Isaiah Mitchell, bassist Aaron Morgan, drummer Justin Pinkerton and keyboardist/vocalist Camilla Saufley-Mitchell. The band's first recording was released on 7-inch in 2011 by Valley King Records with artwork by Alan Forbes. In 2012 Golden Void released their self-titled debut full-length album on Thrill Jockey records. The band's second album 'Berkana' was released on September 18, 2015.

Discography 
Albums
 2012 Golden Void, Thrill Jockey
 2015 Berkana, Thrill Jockey

7-inch EPs
 2011 The Curve, Valley King Records
 2013 Rise to the Out of Reach, Thrill Jockey
 2013 Converse Rubber Tracks Hot Lunch/Golden Void (split), Converse

References

External links 
 Thrill Jockey

Rock music groups from California
2010 establishments in California
Musical groups established in 2010